Argentopyrite  is a moderately rare sulfide mineral with the chemical formula . It is one of the natural compounds of the  type, with M being  caesium in very rare pautovite, copper in relatively common cubanite, potassium in rare rasvumite and thallium in rare picotpaulite. The type locality is Jáchymov in Czech Republic. Chemically similar mineral include sternbergite (dimorphous with argentopyrite), lenaite, and argentopentlandite, .

Crystal structure
Although previously assumed orthorhombic, argentopyrite was later shown to be monoclinic, with structural relationship to cubanite. The most important feature of the argentopyrite structure are:

 hexagonal close-packing of sulfur atoms
 presence of a cluster of four  tetrahedra that share edges
 presence of two iron sites, instead of one as in related species
 ordered-disordered ferrous-ferric nature of the mineral

References

Silver minerals
Sulfide minerals
Monoclinic minerals
Minerals in space group 14